DailyPay is an American financial services company founded in 2015, which provides payroll services such as earned wage access. DailyPay charges up to $2.99 for users to receive 100% of their earned but unpaid income. This fee has been compared to traditional payday lending which has prompted regulatory scrutiny.

History 
DailyPay was founded in 2015 by Jason Lee and Rob Law. The company allows other organizations and payroll providers to offer early access wages to employees. The service is often used by companies with low-wage employees, who work paycheck-to-paycheck.

Employees who use the service are charged a fee to withdraw their wages. The service also allows users to check their balances and track earned wages through their employers.

In September 2016, the company raised $5 million in financing during its Series A Round. In February 2018, the company raised $9 million in Series B funding.

In 2018, human resources company ADP announced that it would be offering early wage access to its clients through DailyPay.

As of 2020, the company had roughly 500,000 active users, and had partnered with companies such as Burger King, Uber, DoorDash and Shiftgig.

In 2021, the company received an honorable mention on Fast Company's "World Changing Ideas Awards".

References

External links 
Official website
Financial technology companies
Financial services companies based in New York City
Financial services companies established in 2015
Earned Wage Access